Guillermo Timoner Obrador (born 24 March 1926) is a retired Spanish cyclist. With six gold and two silver medals won in the UCI Motor-paced World Championships between 1955 and 1965 he is one of the most successful motor-paced racers of all times. During his career, which spanned 52 years, he also won 29 national titles in various cycling disciplines.

Before becoming professional cyclist he worked as  a carpenter. He won his first competition in 1943 and retired around 1965 to work in commerce. He reappeared as a cyclist in 1983, and in 1984 took part in the World Championships in Barcelona in the masters category. In 1995, aged 69, he won the European Championships, biking a distance of 53.4 km with an average speed of 37.4 km/h.

In 1998 he received the Ramon Llull Award from the government of the Balearic Islands.

He lives in his native Felanitx, Balearic Islands, Spain. His younger brother Antonio is also a former competitive cyclist.

References

1926 births
Living people
Spanish male cyclists
Sportspeople from Mallorca
UCI Track Cycling World Champions (men)
Spanish track cyclists
People from Felanitx
Cyclists from the Balearic Islands